Arrast-Larrebieu is a commune in the Pyrénées-Atlantiques department in the Nouvelle-Aquitaine region of south-western France.

The inhabitants of the commune are known as Urrustoitars.

Geography

Arrast-Larrebieu is located in the former province of Soule some 12 km east by south-east of Saint-Palais and 10 km north by north-east of Mauléon-Licharre. Access to the commune is by the D243 road which branches off the D11 west of the commune and north of Espès-Undurein and passes through the village before continuing north-east to join the D115. The D135 from the D11 in the west to Moncayolle-Larrory-Mendibieu in the south-east passes through the south of the commune and the hamlet of Larrebieu. The commune is mainly farmland with many forests scattered throughout the commune.

The Laxubie rises in the south of the commune and flows north past the village gathering many tributaries and joins the Apaure north of the commune. Several small streams rise in the west of the commune and flow west to join the Saison.

Places and Hamlets

 Abbadia
 Aguelcheberry
 Aguerria
 Aitzaguer (ruins)
 Algalarrondo
 Arkabisquey
 Arrast
 Asconeguy
 Behety
 Bethulard
 Bou
 Garatia
 Gastelu
 Gastelu Arrast
 Gasteluchague
 Habiague
 Heguilus
 Hoilly
 Ibarbouen
 Lacoste
 Laplume
 Larçabal
 Larlette
 Larrebieu
 Larribet
 Mendiondo
 Oyhenart
 Poutou
 Sabalain
 Sagardoyburu
 Sallaberry
 Sunhary
 Tine

Toponymy

The commune name in basque today is Ürrüstoi-Larrabile or Ürrustoi-Larrebille.

Jean-Baptiste Orpustan indicated that the spelling in Basque Arrast is sometimes given with the determinant Ürrüxtoia meaning "hazel tree grove". He also stated that larrabil means a "rounded moor, squat".

The following table details the origins of the commune name and other names in the commune.

Sources:

Raymond: Topographic Dictionary of the Department of Basses-Pyrenees, 1863, on the page numbers indicated in the table. 
Orpustan: Jean-Baptiste Orpustan,   New Basque Toponymy

Origins:
Bayonne: Cartulary of Bayonne or Livre d'Or (Book of Gold)
Notaries: Notaries of Navarrenx

History
Paul Raymond noted on page 11 of his 1863 dictionary that the commune had a Lay Abbey, vassal of the Viscounts of Soule.

Larrebieu was merged with the commune of Arrast on 16 October 1842.

Administration

List of Successive Mayors

Inter-communality
The commune is part of seven inter-communal structures:
 the Communauté d'agglomération du Pays Basque;
 the Sanitation association of Pays de Soule;
 the AEP association of Pays de Soule;
 the inter-communal association of la Vallée;
 the Energy association of Pyrénées-Atlantiques;
 the inter-communal association for the construction and operation of the CES at Mauleon;
 the association to support Basque culture.

Demography
In 2017 the commune had 95 inhabitants. The population data given in the table and graph below for 1836 and earlier refer to the former commune of Arrast.

Economy
Economic activity is mainly agricultural (livestock and pasture). The town is part of the Appellation d'origine contrôlée zone designation of Ossau-iraty.

Culture and Heritage

Civil heritage
An enclosure with an earthen parapet (a protohistoric fort or Gaztelu zahar) at an altitude of 282 metres at a place called Gazteluxaga reflects the ancient past of the commune.

Religious heritage

The Parish Church of Sainte-Lucie (19th century) is registered as an historical monument. It has a bell tower called Trinity or Souletin meaning the "top of the wall", pierced by bays for the bells with three roof peaks of approximately equal height, hence the name Trinity. The church contains a Processional Cross (17th century) which is registered as an historical object.

Notable people linked to the commune
Abbadie d'Arrast Family, initially lay abbots whose descendants originated the construction of various chateaux (the Château d'Abbadie at Hendaye, Elorriaga at Ciboure).
Jean-Louis Davant, born in 1935 in Arrast-Larrebieu, is a writer, poet, bertsolari, pastoralari, and academician.

See also
Communes of the Pyrénées-Atlantiques department

References

External links
Arrast-Larrebieu on Géoportail, National Geographic Institute (IGN) website 
Araft and Larrebien on the 1750 Cassini Map

Communes of Pyrénées-Atlantiques